The Alzitone Reservoir is a reservoir in the Haute-Corse department of France.
It dams the Pedocchino stream, but most of the water is supplied from the Réservoir de Trévadine on the Fiumorbo river.
It supplies water for drinking and for irrigation, which during the summer low water is delivered using a pumping station.

Location

The reservoir is in the eastern coastal plain of Corsica.
It is in the south of the commune of Aghione to the north of the T10 Route de Bastia.
The Étang d'Urbino is on the opposite side of the highway.
The reservoir is surrounded by a communal forest with very accessible paths.
From the crest of the dam, there is an excellent view of the coast and the Tyrrhenian Sea.

Dam

The Alzitone Dam is owned and operated by the Office d’Equipement Hydraulique de Corse.
It came into service in 1965, and supplies drinking and irrigation water.
The dam impounds the Pedocchino stream to form a  reservoir holding  of water.
Excluding the feed from the Fium'Orbu, the drainage basin covert just .

Ecology

The Alzitone Reservoir has low biological importance.
Flora include silver wattle (Acacia dealbata), southern blue gum (Eucalyptus globulus) and common reed (Phragmites australis).
Birds include the black-headed gull (Chroicocephalus ridibundus).

Reservoir operations

The Alzitone Reservoir is the largest reservoir of raw water in the south of the eastern plain.
A dam on the Fium'Orbu just downstream from the Sampolo hydroelectric complex creates the Trévadine Reservoir and allows filling the reservoirs in the plain, the  Bacciana, the  Teppe Rosse and the  Alzitone.
The reservoirs in turn deliver water using gravity.
About  of water is taken from the Fium'Orbu in winter with occasional peaks of as much as 
In summer the Fium'Orbu continue to supply  to the reservoirs, but delivery of water to users requires operation of pumping stations.

Gallery

Notes

Sources

Reservoirs of Haute-Corse